Pelopas Kiato is a Greek football club, based in Kiato, Corinthia.

Honours

Domestic

 Amateur Cup: 1
 1990-91
 Corinthia FCA Championship: 13
 1947-48, 1948–49, 1952–53, 1965–66, 1972–73, 1973–74, 1987–88, 1998–99, 2002–03, 2005–06, 2008–09, 2011–12, 2016–17
 Corinthia FCA Cup: 10 
 1972-73, 1978–79, 1990–91, 1993–94, 1994–95, 1995–96, 1996–97, 2002–03, 2003–04, 2017-18

Association football clubs established in 1926
1926 establishments in Greece
Gamma Ethniki clubs